WLSQ may refer to:

 WIHG, a radio station (105.7 FM) licensed to Rockwood, Tennessee, which held the call sign WLSQ in 2007
 WTJF-FM, a radio station (94.3 FM) licensed to Dyer, Tennessee, which held the call sign WLSQ from 1995 to 2006
 WDAL, a radio station (1430 AM) licensed to Dalton, Georgia, which held the call sign WLSQ from 1987 to 1995
 WZKD, a radio station (950 AM) licensed to Montgomery, Alabama, which held the call sign WLSQ from 1977 to 1987